Aflatoon is an Indian Hindi-language crime action film directed by Guddu Dhanoa. The film stars Akshay Kumar in dual roles along with Urmila Matondkar and Anupam Kher in supporting roles.

Plot
Raja (Akshay Kumar), a good-for-nothing loafer trying to get rich quick, impersonates Parimal Chaturvedi, a college professor and enters into a college of beautiful rich women. He falls for rich girl Pooja (Urmila Matondkar), and manages to win her heart. Trouble comes when Pooja's father Prakash (Anupam Kher) mistakes Raja for Rocky (also Akshay Kumar), a ruthless and merciless criminal who blackmails people for money or threatens to kill them, who is a lookalike of Raja. Prakash, who is on Rocky's payroll, asks Raja for help, so Raja impersonates Rocky to get his secrets and Prakash's money. But tables are turned when Rocky finds out about Raja's game. Raja wakes up and finds himself kidnapped in Rocky's mansion. He then realizes he has been drugged for the past seven days, and in these seven days, Rocky has posed as Raja and is set to marry Pooja. Raja is framed and arrested under the name of Rocky. Raja manages to escape and crashes the wedding where he tells the truth and Rocky escapes. Raja follows him to a multi-story building where the two fight brutally. Rocky gains the advantage and knocks out Raja, but he recovers to push Rocky off the building, who falls to his death. At the end Raja and Pooja gets married.

Cast
Akshay Kumar as Rocky Chaturvedi / Raja Chaturvedi (dual role)
Urmila Matondkar as Pooja
Shazia Malik as Sonia, Rocky's love interest.
Farida Jalal as Raja's mother
Harish Patel as the Police Commissioner
Anupam Kher as Vidyaprakash, Pooja's father.
Tiku Talsania as a Police Inspector
Remo D'Souza as Raja's friend
Subbiraj as College Principal 
Sonia Sahni as College Professor

Soundtrack
The song "We Love We Love Rocky" was inspired by Queen's song We Will Rock You. The song "Poster Lagwado Bazar Mein" was recreated by Tanishk Bagchi for 2019 film Luka Chuppi

References

External links
 
 

1997 films
1990s action films
1990s crime drama films
1990s Hindi-language films
Films scored by Dilip Sen-Sameer Sen
1997 drama films
Hindi-language action films
Films directed by Guddu Dhanoa